GSU Tiger Marching Band, also known as the Tiger Marching Band is Grambling State University's marching band. It is often billed as the "World Famed Tiger Marching Band". The band was formed by Ralph Waldo Emerson Jones in 1926.

Highlights

 In 1967 and 1968, the band performed in Super Bowls I and II, respectively, prior to the NFL championship game being officially called The Super Bowl.  Grambling's 1967 performance has been named "One of the Top 10 Super Bowl Halftime Shows" by Sports Illustrated magazine.
 In 1972, the marching Tigers played in Monrovia, Liberia, at the inauguration of Liberian President William R. Tolbert.
 In 1976, the GSU band performed in the first-ever Pioneer Bowl in Tokyo, Japan.
 In 1977, GSU World Famed Tiger Marching Band performed in Mirage Bowl, Tokyo, Japan.
 In 1978, GSU World Famed Tiger Marching Band, pushed back at HalfTime, Bayou Classic, to introduce their first all female dance line "ORCHESIS" to the World, Lead by Artistic Director/Choreographer Virgie Broussard (Pradia). One Original member of "ORCHESIS" was Choreographer/Producer Deborah A Gibson (MC HAMMER Too Legit Tour), and Cousin to Erykah Badu/National Recording Artist
 In 1978, GSU World Famed Tiger Marching Band were HalfTime Guest performers for Dallas Cowboys at the Original Texas Stadium in Irving, Texas where the showcased their Original 10 Members of GSU Orchesis danceline
In 1981, The band performed in the Hollywood films Grambling's White Tiger (1981).
Also in 1981, the band appeared in "Marching Band/Coke Is It," an award-winning television commercial developed for Coca-Cola USA by Burrell Communications Group.
In 1982, Grambling State University World Famed Tiger Marching Band was Special Guest to the Emperor of Japan, perform in Osaka, Japan and halftime performers at the Tokyo, Japan Mirage Bowl game.
 Alum Director/Choreographer Virgie Broussard (Pradia); and Dancer Deborah A Gibson/1982 GSU Alum.   
 In 1999, U.S. President Bill Clinton performed (on saxophone) with the band for a halftime show in Grambling, Louisiana.

In 1999, the Tiger Marching Band along with GSU's acclaimed dance troupe "The Orchesis Dance Company" was featured in a nationally televised commercial as part of Procter & Gamble's "Tampax Was There" marketing campaign.
 In 1999, the band was featured in commercial bumpers for Cartoon Network's "Cartoon Cartoon Fridays" block. They performed the main Cartoon Cartoons theme, as well as the theme songs for other Cartoon Network shows.
In 1998, the band was featured in Super Bowl XXXII, alongside Boyz II Men, Martha Reeves and Smokey Robinson.
In 2001, GSU World Famed Tiger Marching Band was included in the inaugural parade for U.S. President George W. Bush.
In 2002, GSU World Famed performed in the motion picture Drumline.
The band recorded an album entitled "A Tribute To Motown" Motown Records (2005).
In 2006, "Season of the Tiger," a six-part docudrama aired, following members of the Grambling State University (LA) marching band and football team during the 2005-2006 football season. Produced by DAFT films and Black Entertainment Television (BET), "Season of the Tiger" was the second BET reality show to focus on life at a historically black institution (HBCU), and the first to highlight the competitive environment of marching bands at some HBCUs.
 In 2006 The Band Was Featured In NCAA March Madness 2006 (Video Game) Soundtrack 
In 2007, the band performed in the award-winning Denzel Washington film, The Great Debators.
In the 118th Tournament of Roses Parade (2007), Grambling State's marching band was the marching band in the Star Wars Spectacular, in which all members were wearing Imperial officer uniforms. This was the band's second time in the Tournament of Roses Parade: 1980 being the first time an HBCU band was selected to march and lead in the Tournament of Roses Parade.
 In 2009, GSU World Famed Tiger Marching Band was included in the inaugural parade for U.S. President Barack Obama.
 In 2010, the band's drumline, "Chocolate Thunder", performed at halftime in the NBA All-Star Game with artist Shakira.
 In 2013, the band was included in the second inaugural parade for U.S. President Barack Obama.
In 2015, Drake mentioned the band in his hit song "Used to" featuring Lil' Wayne on his If You're Reading This It's Too Late mixtape.
In 2016, Vice Media released a documentary covering the significance of GSU's marching band and the popularity of the annual battle against Southern Universitys Human Jukebox in the Mercedes-Benz Superdome.
In 2019, select members from the band and Orchesis danceline were invited to perform for Beyonce and other guests at a private event in California during Coachella.
The Tiger Marching Band have an average of 160 students with a grade points average of 3.00 or higher each year.
In 2021, the Tiger Marching Band was one of the participants in the virtual inauguration event for U.S. President Joe Biden.
 In 2022, the band performed at halftime of the inaugural HBCU Legacy Bowl, the February 2022 edition.

References

External links
GSU Tiger Marching Band website

Grambling State University
Southwestern Athletic Conference marching bands
1926 establishments in Louisiana
Musical groups established in 1926